Shukhurdino is a rural locality (a village) in Bryzgalovskoye Rural Settlement, Kameshkovsky District, Vladimir Oblast, Russia. The population was 42 as of 2010.

Geography 
Shukhurdino is located 12 km north of Kameshkovo (the district's administrative centre) by road. Abrosimovo is the nearest rural locality.

References 

Rural localities in Kameshkovsky District